Sørkappøya (English: South Cape Island) is an uninhabited 7 km long island at the southern tip of Spitsbergen, the largest island of the Svalbard archipelago. Five kilometers north of the island is Sørkapp (South Cape), the southern cape of Spitsbergen's main island.

References
 
 Norwegian Polar Institute: Place names in Norwegian polar areas

 
Islands of Svalbard
Uninhabited islands of Norway